Qibao station may refer to:

 Qibao station (Shanghai Metro), a metro station in Shanghai, China
 Qibao railway station, a railway station in Shanghai, China
 Qibao station (Hangzhou Metro), a metro station in Hangzhou, China